The deaths of Simone Camilli and Ali Shehda Abu Afash occurred while the two journalists were reporting on the 2014 Israel–Gaza conflict. Simone Camilli (c. 1979  – 13 August 2014), an Italian, and Ali Shehda Abu Afash (ca. 1979  – 13 August 2014), a Palestinian, were journalists for the Associated Press. They were reporting on a bomb disposal team in Beit Lahiya, located in the Gaza Strip, at the time of their death. Camilli was the first foreign journalist to die in the 2014 Israel and Gaza dispute.

Personal history
Simone Camilli was born in Rome, Italy, on 28 March 1979. He and his partner Ylva van den Berg have a daughter named Nour Camilli. His funeral was held on Friday, 15 August 2014 in the Cathedral of SS Peter and Paul in Pitigliano, where his father had been the mayor since 2011.
 
Ali Shehda Abu Afash was born around 1978. He was married to Shireen Abu Afash, and had two daughters named Majd (7) and Wajd (2).

Career
Simone Camilli began as an intern in Rome for the Associated Press in 2005. One of his first assignments was the death of Pope John Paul. In 2006, he moved to Jerusalem, where he covered stories of conflict and wartime in places like Israel and the Palestinian territories, Lebanon, and Iraq. He was interested in reporting on war and its effects on people's lives. In 2014, he moved to Beirut, Lebanon. During the Israeli operation in the Gaza Strip, he decided to report on the conflict.

Abu Afash was a computer engineer at a health union in the Gaza Strip. He quit this work to be a journalist. From there, he worked for the Gaza Centre for Media Freedom as a Palestinian translator and journalist. He reported for three months on the problems Palestinian journalists dealt with and that of a training program within its sister organization, the Doha Centre for Media Freedom.

Death
Camilli and Abu Afash died while reporting on the morning of 13 August 2014 in Beit Lahiya. A soccer field located in the Gaza Strip had a live bomb, which was dropped by an Israel F-16. That Wednesday, Camilli and Abu Afash were at the scene filming the Gazan Police Force while they attempted to defuse the explosive. The story they were working on was about the ordnance crew. The bomb exploded during the process and killed six people, including the two journalists.

Hatem Moussa, an AP photographer who was working with Camilli and Abu Afash, survived but was badly injured from the explosion.

Reactions
Camilli was the 33rd journalist to die while reporting for the Associated Press. Maria Grazia Murru, a senior producer at the AP who worked with Camilli, said, "Camilli was passionate about wanting to tell people’s stories and wanted to be where the story was all the time. He wanted to learn everything and be the first, he was never happy waiting for images to happen."

Irina Bokova, director-general of UNESCO, said, "I deplore the death of Simone Camilli and Ali Shehda Abu Afash, lifting the death toll of media workers from the current conflict (to eight journalists at the time). The loss of individuals who brave danger to ensure that the world is kept informed of events in conflict zones affects to us all."

Pope Francis conducted a silent prayer with a group of around 70 journalists who were aboard the papal plane and at the time heading to a visit in South Korea.

See also
 List of journalists killed during the Israeli-Palestinian conflict
 James Miller (filmmaker) - Welsh documentary filmmaker killed by the IDF in 2003

References

Associated Press reporters
Deaths by explosive device
Journalists killed while covering the Israeli–Palestinian conflict
Palestinian journalists
Italian journalists
August 2014 events in Asia
2014 in the Gaza Strip